Prince Ying of the First Rank, or simply Prince Ying, was the title of a princely peerage used in China during the Manchu-led Qing dynasty (1644–1912). As the Prince Ying peerage was not awarded "iron-cap" status, this meant that each successive bearer of the title would normally start off with a title downgraded by one rank vis-à-vis that held by his predecessor. However, the title would generally not be downgraded to any lower than a feng'en fuguo gong except under special circumstances.

The first bearer of the title was Ajige (1605–1651), the 12th son of Nurhaci, the founder of the Qing dynasty. In 1644, Ajige was granted the title "Prince Ying of the First Rank" by his nephew, the Shunzhi Emperor. However, in 1651, he was stripped of his title and forced to commit suicide after his failed attempt to seize the position of Prince-Regent after Dorgon's death. The peerage was passed down over 12 generations and held by 15 persons.

Members of the Prince Ying peerage

 Ajige (1st), Nurhaci's 12th son, initially a beile, made a second-rank prince in 1636 under the title "Prince Wuying of the Second Rank" (武英郡王), promoted to "Prince Ying of the First Rank" in 1644, stripped of his title and forced to commit suicide in 1651
 Fulehe (傅勒赫; 1629–1660), Ajige's second son, posthumously honoured as a grace defender duke' in 1662
 Chuokedu (綽克都; 1651 – 1711) (2nd), Fulehe's third son, held the title of a grace defender duke from 1665 to 1698, stripped of his title in 1698
 Xingshou (興綬; 1689 – 1724), Chuokedu's seventh son, posthumously honoured as a grace bulwark duke
 Jiucheng (九成; 1710 – 1766) (7th), Xingshou's eldest son, held the title of a grace bulwark duke from 1746 to 1761, stripped of his title in 1761
 Qiande (謙德; 1749–1767) (8th), Jiucheng's fourth son, held the title of a third class defender general from 1761 to 1767, had no male heir
 Shunde (順德; 1754 – 1800) (9th), Jiucheng's seventh son, held the title of a grace general from 1767 to 1796
 Huaying (華英; 1784 – 1831) (10th), Shunde's eldest son, held the title of a grace general from 1796 to 1830, stripped of his title in 1830
 Puzhao (普照; 1691 – 1724) (3rd), Chuokedu's eighth son, held the title of a grace bulwark duke from 1698 to 1713, stripped of his title in 1713
 Jingzhao (經照; 169 8– 1744) (4th), Chuokedu's ninth son, held the title of a grace bulwark duke from 1713 to 1732, stripped of his title in 1732
 Longde (隆德; 1672 – 1733), Chuokedu's son
 Luda (璐達; 1705 – 1741) (5th), Longde's second son, held the title of a grace bulwark duke from 1732 to 1741, posthumously honoured as Grace Bulwark Duke Gongjian (奉恩輔國恭簡公)
 Linkui (麟魁; 1726 – 1769) (6th), Luda's eldest son, held the title of a grace bulwark duke from 1741 to 1745, stripped of his title in 1745
 Hutuli (瑚圖禮; 1688 – 1746), Chuokedu's son
 E'erheyi (額爾赫宜; 1743 – 1790), Hutuli's son
 Shuochen (碩臣; 1772 – 1819), E'erheyi's son
 Huade (華德; 1789 – 1847) (11th), Shuochen's eldest son, held the title of a grace general from 1831 to 1847
 Xiuping (秀平; 1811 – 1855) (12th), Huade's eldest son, held the title of a grace general from 1848 to 1855
 Liangzhe (良喆; 1842 – 1890) (13th), Xiuping's second son, held the title of a grace general from 1855 to 1890
 Longxu (隆煦; 1866 – 1909) (14th), Liangzhe's second son, held the title of a grace general from 1890 to 1909
 Cunyao (存耀; b. 1899) (15th), Longxu's eldest son, held the title of a grace general from 1910
 Tieqin (鐵欽; b. 1922), Cunyao's son

Cadet line

Ajige's line

 Hedu (和度; 1619 – 1646), Ajige's eldest son, initially held the title of a grace bulwark duke, promoted to beizi in 1644, had no male heir
 Fulehe (傅勒赫; 1629–1660), Ajige's second son, posthumously honoured as a grace defender duke' in 1662
 Gouzi (構孳; died 1666), Fulehe's second son, held the title of a grace bulwark duke from 1661 to 1666
 Nayan (訥延), Gouzi's son, held the title of a defender general from 1666 to 1667, had no male heir
 Louqin (樓親; 1634 – 1661), Ajige's sixth son, held the title of a first-rank prince but was stripped of his title later and forced to commit suicide

Chuodeku's line

 Suyan (素嚴; died 1692), Chuokedu's eldest son, held the title of a grace bulwark duke from 1682 to 1692
 Subai (素拜; died 1695), Suyan's third son, held the title of a third class defender general from 1692 to 1695, had no male heir

Puzhao's line

 Hengxin (亨新), Puzhao's son, held the title of a grace bulwark duke from 1724 to 1732, stripped of his title in 1732

Family tree

See also
 Royal and noble ranks of the Qing dynasty

References
 

Qing dynasty princely peerages